Mameh Shir (also Romanized as Mameh Shīr) is a village in Sarajuy-ye Jonubi Rural District, Saraju District, Maragheh County, East Azerbaijan Province, Iran. At the 2006 census, its population was 41, in 6 families.

References 

Towns and villages in Maragheh County